Cladococcus is a genus of radiolarians.

Species 
 Cladococcus abietinus Haeckel, 1887
 Cladococcus cervicornis Haeckel, 1860
 Cladococcus leptus Hülsemann, 1963
 Cladococcus megaceros Boltovskoy & Riedel, 1980
 Cladococcus scoparius Haeckel, 1887
 Cladococcus viminalis Haeckel, 1860

References

Polycystines